South Korea, as Republic of Korea, competed at the 1994 Winter Olympics in Lillehammer, Norway.

Medalists

Competitors
The following is the list of number of competitors in the Games.

Alpine skiing

Men

Cross-country skiing

Men

Figure skating

Men

Women

Short track speed skating

Men

Women

Speed skating

Men

Women

References

Sources
Official Olympic Reports
International Olympic Committee results database

Korea, South
1994
Winter Olympics